John Joseph Barry (April 26, 1887 – April 23, 1961) was an American shortstop, second baseman, and manager in Major League Baseball, and later a college baseball coach. From  through , Barry played for the Philadelphia Athletics (1908–15) and Boston Red Sox (1915–19).

Philadelphia Athletics
Born in Meriden, Connecticut, Barry spent his nearly entire tenure in the big leagues on winning teams, first the Philadelphia Athletics and later the Boston Red Sox. Athletics manager Connie Mack signed Barry off the campus of the College of the Holy Cross to play shortstop on what would become his famous $100,000 infield. The unit, one of the most famous groups of teammates in baseball history, consisted of first baseman Stuffy McInnis, second baseman Eddie Collins, and third baseman Frank Baker. The group was critical to the Athletics winning the American League pennant in 1910, 1911, 1913 and 1914, and World Championships in 1910, 1911, and 1913.

Boston Red Sox
In 1915, the year after the Boston Braves swept the Athletics in the World Series, Red Sox owner Joe Lannin paid $8,000 for Barry's services, as Mack was dismantling the team. Upon joining the Red Sox, he hit just .262 but played reliable defense at shortstop, proving to be the last piece of the puzzle in what was to be another pennant-winning team. He played in the World Series in 1915 and 1916 for the Red Sox. Acknowledged as the team's on-field leader, he became a player-manager in 1917, leading the team to a 90-win season and a second-place finish to the Chicago White Sox. In the war year of 1917, manager Jack Barry chose to enlist and on October 18, 1917, Jack and four other Red Sox players, who had enlisted as yeomen in the naval reserve, were called to active duty and ordered to report for duty on November 3, 1917. He served all of 1918 in the military. After poor play in 1919, he decided to retire rather than be sold away in another fire sale following Harry Frazee's decision to sell his shortstop back to the Athletics.

In an 11-season career, Barry posted a .243 batting average with 10 home runs and 429 RBI in 1223 games.

Managerial record

Holy Cross
Barry became the head coach at Holy Cross in 1921, and continued in that position for 40 years until his death in Shrewsbury, Massachusetts at age 73. During his tenure, he posted the highest career winning percentage (.806) in collegiate history, and won the  College World Series. In 2007, he was an inaugural veteran inductee of the College Baseball Hall of Fame along with Lou Gehrig, Christy Mathewson, and Joe Sewell. In 1943 he became Holy Cross' acting athletic following the death of Tom McCabe and remained in that role until Gene Flynn returned from the United States Army in 1946.

See also

List of Major League Baseball player–managers

References

External links

1887 births
1961 deaths
Holy Cross Crusaders baseball players
Boston Red Sox managers
Boston Red Sox players
Holy Cross Crusaders baseball coaches
Baseball players from Connecticut
Major League Baseball shortstops
Philadelphia Athletics players
People from Meriden, Connecticut
People from Shrewsbury, Massachusetts
Sportspeople from New Haven County, Connecticut
Sportspeople from Worcester County, Massachusetts
Major League Baseball player-managers
National College Baseball Hall of Fame inductees
United States Navy personnel of World War I
United States Navy reservists
United States Navy sailors
Holy Cross Crusaders athletic directors